Prisojnica is a village in the municipality of Mavrovo and Rostuša, North Macedonia.

Demographics
Prisojnica (Prisovinçe) is attested in the Ottoman defter of 1467 as a village in the ziamet of Reka which was under the authority of  Karagöz Bey. The settlement had a total of five households and the anthroponymy attested depicts an Albanian character: Progon Primiqyri, Dimitri Gjoneci, Petër Arrasi, Dimitri Arrasi, and Dimitri Palama.  
 
Prisojnica has traditionally been inhabited by a Muslim Macedonian (Torbeš) population.

According to the 2002 census, the village had a total of 315 inhabitants. Ethnic groups in the village include:

Macedonians 232
Turks 66
Bosniaks 6
Albanians 2
Others 9

References

Villages in Mavrovo and Rostuša Municipality
Macedonian Muslim villages